Coleophora darwini is a moth of the family Coleophoridae. It is found on the Galápagos archipelago where it has been collected on Pinzón, Española, and Pinta islands.

The wingspan is 7.8-9.4 mm for males and 8.4-10.6 mm for females. Adults have a dark, grey-brown upper surface and forewing veins overlined with white. Adults have been recorded in April.

The larvae feed on Amaranthus anderssonii and probably other Amaranthus species. They mine the leaves of their host plant. They create a tubular silk case. It is trivalved with flared valvae. The anterior end is constricted before the mouth and the mouth angle is about 30°. It is light brown with distinct longitudinal stripes of various shades of beige or brown demarcating silk additions from progressive stages of girth enlargement. The length of the mature case is 5.5–6.9 mm.

Etymology
The species is named after Charles Darwin, whose visit to the Galápagos Islands fostered his ideas on natural selection.

References

darwini
Moths described in 2006
Moths of South America